Delač may refer to:

 Delač, Slovenia, a village in Slovenia
 Matej Delač, Croatian footballer
 Mario Delač, Croatian swimmer